"Sparks" is a song by English pop singer-songwriter Stevie Appleton from his second studio album, Colours. The track was released on July 20, 2011, and is marketed as the lead single from his Colours album.

Track listing
Digital download
 "Sparks" - 3:08

Chart performance
The single has peaked at #21 in Japan and it has reached #4 in the country's national airplay chart.  The album Colours charted at 24 according to the official Oricon chart.

Charts

Release history

External links

References

2011 singles
Stevie Appleton songs